A doppelgänger is an apparition or double of a living person in folklore and fiction.

Doppelgänger may also refer to:

Books
Doppelganger (Brennan novel), a 2006 fantasy novel by Marie Brennan
The Doppelganger: Literature's Philosophy, 2010 book by Dimitris Vardoulakis
Doppelganger, a 2006 novel by Michael Parker
Doppelganger, a 2008 novel by Pete Hautman
Doppelganger, a 2010 novel by Jenny Valentine
The Doppelganger, a 1936 novel by Hammond Innes
Doppelganger (comics), a fictional character and supervillain appearing in Marvel Comics

Film and television

Doppelgänger (1969 film), British science fiction film
Doppelganger (1993 film), American supernatural thriller film starring Drew Barrymore
Doppelganger (2003 film), Japanese black comedy film by Kiyoshi Kurosawa
Doppelganger (TV series), Singaporean TV drama
"Doppelgangers" (How I Met Your Mother),  TV series episode
"Doppelganger" (Arrow), TV series episode
Doppelgänger, 1979 video made by Elaine Shemilt
"Doppelganger", episode of The Legend of Zelda
"Doppelganger, episode of the 1984 cartoon Challenge of the GoBots
"Doppelgänger", episode of Alias (season 1)
"Doppelgänger", episode of NCIS (season 2)
"Doppelganger", episode of Stargate Atlantis (season 4) 
"Doppelgängers", episode of Parks and Recreation (season 6)

Games
Doppleganger (video game), a 1985 videogame
Doppelganger (Dungeons & Dragons), a type of creature in Dungeons & Dragons
Doppelgänger, an enemy of Lara Croft presented in form of her dark alter ego in the Tomb Raider franchise, including Tomb Raider: Underworld

Music
"Der Doppelgänger", a setting by Franz Schubert of a poem by Heinrich Heine

Albums

Doppelgänger (Curve album) (1992)
Doppelgänger (Daniel Amos album) (1983)
Doppelganger (Kid Creole and the Coconuts album) (1983)
Doppelgänger (The Fall of Troy album) (2005)
Doppelgänger (The Grid album) (2008)

Songs
"Doppelgänger", a 2004 song by Efterklang from Tripper
"Doppelgänger", a 2003 song by Shiina Ringo from Kalk Samen Kuri no Hana
"Doppelgänger", a 2022 song by Joshua Bassett

See also
"Doppelgangland", an episode of Buffy the Vampire Slayer